Selenicereus monacanthus, synonym Hylocereus monacanthus, is a species of plant in the family Cactaceae. It is native to parts of Central America and South America (Colombia, Costa Rica, Ecuador, Nicaragua, Panama, Peru, Trinidad and Tobago and Venezuela).

References

External links

Flora of Central America
Flora of northern South America
Flora of western South America
monacanthus